In the law of evidence, a presumption of a particular fact can be made without the aid of proof in some situations. The invocation of a presumption shifts the burden of proof from one party to the opposing party in a court trial.

There are two types of presumption: rebuttable presumption and conclusive presumption. A rebuttable presumption is assumed true until a person proves otherwise (for example the presumption of innocence). In contrast, a conclusive (or irrebuttable) presumption cannot be refuted in any case (such as defense of infancy in some legal systems).

Presumptions are sometimes categorized into two types: presumptions without basic facts, and presumptions with basic facts. In the United States, mandatory presumptions are impermissible in criminal cases, but permissible presumptions are allowed.

An example of presumption without basic facts is presumption of innocence.

An example of presumption with basic facts is Declared death in absentia, e.g., the law says if a person has been missing for seven years or more (basic fact), that person is presumed dead.

History

The ancient Jewish law code, the Talmud, included reasoning from presumptions (hazakah), propositions taken to be true unless there was reason to believe otherwise, such as "One does not ordinarily pay a debt before term."

The same concept was found in ancient Roman law, where, for example, if there was doubt as to whether a child was really the issue of someone who had left money in a will, the presumption was in favour of the child. Medieval Roman and canon law graded presumptions according to strength: light, medium or probable, and violent. These gradings and many individual presumptions were taken over into English law in the seventeenth century by Edward Coke.

Specific presumptions
A number of presumptions are found in most common law jurisdictions.  Examples of these presumptions include:
The presumption of death.  A person who has been absent for seven years without explanation and "gone to parts unknown" is presumed dead at common law.  The time period it takes for the presumption to arise has often been modified by statute.
The presumption of sanity. A person who faces criminal trial is presumed sane until the opposite is proved.  Similarly, a person is presumed to have testamentary capacity until there is evidence to undermine that presumption.
The presumption of innocence, which holds that the prosecution bears the burden of proof in a criminal case with the result that the accused may be acquitted without putting forward any evidence.
The presumption of legitimacy or presumption of paternity, which presumes that a husband is the biological father of a child born to his wife during the marriage, or within nine months after the marriage is ended by death, legal separation, or divorce.  Some jurisdictions also hold that a presumption of paternity arises when a father accepts a child into his home, or publicly represents that he is the child's father.
A presumption of survivorship has referred to a number of different presumptions.  The term is sometimes used to refer to presumptions that one or another of two persons lived the longer when they died together in the same accident.  The presumption that two or more people who establish a joint account intend for the survivors to have the assets put into the fund upon the death of one of the joint account holders has also been called the "presumption of survivorship".
The presumption of mailing presumes that a properly addressed letter delivered to the post office or a common carrier was in fact delivered and received by the addressee.
The presumption of fraud or undue influence arises where a person in a position of trust over another, such as a guardian or the holder of a power of attorney applies the other person's assets to his or her own benefit.
The presumption of validity is another way of expressing a burden of proof: the official acts of courts are presumed valid, and those who would challenge them must overcome this presumption. This is also termed the presumption of regularity.
The presumption of advancement in relation to transfers from husbands to wives and from fathers to children.
In the law of the United States, the presumption of constitutionality presumes that all statutes are drafted in accordance with Federal and state constitutional requirements.  The party challenging the constitutionality of a statute bears the burden of proof, and any doubts are resolved against that party. If there are two reasonable interpretations of a statute, one of which is constitutional and the other not, the courts choose the path that permits upholding the statute.

See also 

 Conclusive (irrebuttable) presumption
 Legal burden of proof
 Prima facie
 Rebuttable presumption

Notes and references

Further reading
John Hubbersty Mathews and Benjamin Rand. A Treatise on the Doctrine of Presumption and Presumptive Evidence: As Affecting the Title to Real and Personal Property. Gould, Banks and Company. New York. 1830. Google Books
William Mawdesley Best. A Treatise on Presumptions of Law and Fact, with the Theory and Rules of Presumptive or Circumstantial Proof in Criminal Cases. London. 1844. Google Books. Philadelphia. 1845. Google Books
John Davison Lawson. The Law of Presumptive Evidence: Including Presumptions both of Law and of Fact, and the Burden of Proof both in Civil and Criminal Cases, Reduced to Rules. Bancroft-Whitney Company. 1886. Google Books

Evidence law
Legal doctrines and principles